Nicrophorus semenowi is a burying beetle described by Edmund Reitter in 1887. It is endemic to China where it is known from the provinces of Gansu, Qinghai, and Tibet.

References

Silphidae
Beetles of Asia
Insects of China
Endemic fauna of China
Fauna of Tibet
Beetles described in 1887
Taxa named by Edmund Reitter